1607 Mavis, provisional designation , is a stony asteroid from the central region of the asteroid belt, approximately 12 kilometers in diameter. It was discovered on 3 September 1950, by South African astronomer Ernest Johnson at Johannesburg Observatory in South Africa. It was later named after the wife of astronomer Jacobus Bruwer.

Orbit and classification 

This asteroid orbits the Sun in the middle main-belt at a distance of 1.8–3.3 AU once every 4 years and 1 month (1,487 days). Its orbit has an eccentricity of 0.30 and an inclination of 9° with respect to the ecliptic.

Physical characteristics 

Mavis is a stony S-type asteroid.

Rotation period 

In September 2007, Australian astronomers Collin Bembrick and Julian Oey independently obtained two rotational lightcurves of Mavis. These well-defined lightcurves gave a rotation period of 6.1339 and 6.1508 hours with a brightness variation of 0.50 and 0.53 magnitude, respectively.

Diameter and albedo 

According to the surveys carried out by the Japanese Akari satellite and NASA's Wide-field Infrared Survey Explorer with its subsequent NEOWISE mission, Mavis measures between 11.57 and 14.91 kilometers in diameter and its surface has an albedo between 0.189 and 0.31. The Collaborative Asteroid Lightcurve Link derives an albedo of 0.3320 and a diameter of 12.10 kilometers based on an absolute magnitude of 11.4.

Naming 

This minor planet was named in honor of the Mavis Bruwer, wife of astronomer Jacobus Albertus Bruwer, who was an astronomer at Johannesburg Observatory, and after whom 1811 Bruwer was named. The official  was published by the Minor Planet Center on 20 February 1976.

References

External links 
 Asteroid Lightcurve Database (LCDB), query form (info )
 Dictionary of Minor Planet Names, Google books
 Asteroids and comets rotation curves, CdR – Observatoire de Genève, Raoul Behrend
 Discovery Circumstances: Numbered Minor Planets (1)-(5000) – Minor Planet Center
 
 

001607
Discoveries by Ernest Leonard Johnson
Named minor planets
19500903